Elena Dementieva and Janette Husárová defeated Cara Black and Elena Likhovtseva in the final, 4–6, 6–4, 6–3 to win the doubles tennis title at the 2002 WTA Tour Championships.

Lisa Raymond and Rennae Stubbs were the defending champions, but were defeated in the semifinals by Black and Likhovtseva.

Seeds
  Virginia Ruano Pascual /  Paola Suárez (first round)
  Lisa Raymond /  Rennae Stubbs (semifinals)
  Elena Dementieva /  Janette Husárová (champions)
  Daniela Hantuchová /  Arantxa Sánchez Vicario (withdrew)
  Cara Black /  Elena Likhovtseva (final)

Draw

Finals

References

Doubles
2002 WTA Tour